Back to Oakland is the fourth album by  Bay Area based band Tower of Power, released in early 1974 on Warner Bros. Records. It was voted by Modern Drummer magazine as one of the most important recordings for drummers to listen to. The cover photography was by Bruce Steinberg at San Francisco–Oakland Bay Bridge, San Francisco, California.

Track listing 
"Oakland Stroke..." (Emilio Castillo, David Garibaldi, Stephen Kupka) - 0:53
"Don't Change Horses (In the Middle of a Stream)" (Johnny "Guitar" Watson, Lenny Williams) - 4:28
"Just When We Start Makin' It" (Castillo, Kupka, Lenny Williams) - 6:30
"Can't You See (You Doin' Me Wrong)" (Castillo, Kupka, Williams) - 3:00
"Squib Cakes" (Chester Thompson) - 7:49
"Time Will Tell" (Castillo, Kupka) - 3:11
"Man from the Past" (Castillo, Kupka, Williams) - 4:00
"Love's Been Gone So Long" (Bruce Conte) - 4:47
"I Got the Chop" (Castillo, Kupka) - 2:59
"Below Us, All the City Lights" (Castillo, Kupka) - 4:20
"...Oakland Stroke" (Castillo, Garibaldi, Kupka) - 1:08

Personnel 
Tower of Power
 Lenny Williams – lead vocals
 Chester Thompson – acoustic piano, Fender Rhodes, clavinet, organ, bass pedals, backing vocals, arrangements (5)
 Bruce Conte – guitars, backing vocals
 Francis Rocco Prestia – bass guitar
 David Garibaldi – drums
 Brent Byars – congas
 Lenny Pickett – alto saxophone, bass saxophone, soprano saxophone, first tenor saxophone, flute, alto flute, piccolo
 Stephen "Doc" Kupka – baritone saxophone, English horn, backing vocals
 Emilio Castillo – second tenor saxophone, backing vocals
 Mic Gillette – trombone, bass trombone, trumpet, flugelhorn, backing vocals
 Greg Adams – trumpet, flugelhorn, orchestra bells, backing vocals, string arrangements, string conductor (1-9, 11), arrangements (3, 4, 6, 8, 10)
 Tower of Power – arrangements (2, 4, 7, 9)

Additional musicians
 Bud Shank – alto saxophone (10), flute (10), alto flute (10), piccolo (10)
 Ray Gillette – trombone (6)
 Kell Houston – trombone (6)
 Frank Rosolino – trombone (10)
 Tommy Shepard – trombone (10)
 David Duke – French horn (10)
 Vincent DeRosa – French horn (10)
 Richard Perissi – French horn (10)
 Harry Betts – string conductor (10)
 Marylin Scott – backing vocals (2, 3, 4, 6, 8)
 Pepper Watkins – backing vocals (2, 3, 4)
 Alice Thompson – backing vocals (6)

Production 
 Tower of Power – producers
 Emilio Castillo – supervising producer 
 Alan Chinowsky – sound production, mixing
 Tom Flye – recording 
 Jim Gaines – recording, mixing 
 Bruce Steinberg – album design, photography

Charts

Singles

References

External links
 Tower Of Power-Back To Oakland at Discogs

1974 albums
Tower of Power albums
Warner Records albums